Amor Masoud Al-Sharji is an Omani Olympic middle-distance runner. He represented his country in the men's 1500 meters at the 1984 Summer Olympics. His time was a 4:12.76 in the first heat. He is the brother of fellow athlete Barakat Al-Sharji.

References

External links
 

1964 births
Living people
Omani male middle-distance runners
Olympic athletes of Oman
Athletes (track and field) at the 1984 Summer Olympics